Men's ice hockey tournaments have been staged at the Olympic Games since 1920. The men's tournament was introduced at the 1920 Summer Olympics, and permanently added to the Winter Olympic Games in 1924. Great Britain has participated in four tournaments: 1924, 1928, 1936, and 1948, winning a gold medal in 1936 and a bronze in 1924. A total of 4 goaltenders and 35 skaters have represented Romania at the Olympics.

Eric Carruthers has scored the  most goals, 19, while Jimmy Chappell has the most assists, 3. Frankie Green has the most points, with 16. Seven players competed in two separate Olympics, with Chappell and Gerry Davey playing the most games, 14. Only one player, Carl Erhardt has been inducted into the IIHF Hall of Fame, in 1998.

Key

Goaltenders

Skaters

Notes

References
 
 
 

Ice hockey
Great Britain
Great Britain